Woh Aik Pal is a drama which started airing on 11 March 2017 every Saturdays on Hum TV. The series starring Ayesha Khan, and Feroze Khan playing leads, and stars Ramsha Khan, and Aly Khan playing main antagonist of this series.

Plot 
The story revolves around a happily married couple, Unaiza (Ayesha Khan) and Faris (Emmad Irfani) who also have a child, Zaid (Sami Khan). On one tragic rainy night, a trio of friends, which includes Arish (Feroze Khan) attempt to rob Faris but Arish's friends accidentally shoots Faris as Arish tried to take the gun away.

Arish is in love with his college friend, Hina (Ramsha Khan) and has been engaged to her for 5 years.  Arish feels guilty as he feels responsible for causing Unaiza to become a widow and her child to become fatherless. Meanwhile, Unaiza who is heartbroken stays at her sister's house where her brother-in-law, Ahsan (Alyy Khan) gives her a tough time. Arish, who is trying to ease his guilt for being a part of Faris' murder starts to help Unazia with her work and becomes good friends with her and her son. While Hina is in Dubai meeting her parents, Arish decides to marry Unaiza to protect her from all the hardships a widowed women and a single mother has to face in society as well as from her brother-in-law who is trying to take over Faris' business. When Hina comes back from Dubai she come to a total shock and she lashes out at  the both of them. Later Ahsaan advises Hina to take her revenge for Arish and Unaiza's betrayal. As Arish and Unaiza starting living together as a married couple, they face many misunderstandings and hardships. Unaiza believes that the reason for their failing marriage is because Arish and her betrayed Hina. Despite Arish's disapproval, she brings Hina into their home, where Arish believes that Hina is trying to break their marriage and starts hating her. However, while Hina is trying to take revenge from the two, Unaiza and Arish grow closer. Arish also deeply befriends Zaid. A twist of events shows Unaiza discovering Arsih being responsible for her late husband's death as a result of which she starts hating him, despite being pregnant with his child. She considers an abortion but is unable to go through with it because she realizes that she has fallen for him. In another series of events, Unaiza announces her love for Arish and vice versa, while Hina is heart broken but still manages to forgive him for breaking her heart and for forgiving her for creating all the problems in his married life.

Cast 
 Ayesha Khan as Uneza 
 Feroze Khan as Arish
 Ramsha Khan as Hina
 Alyy Khan as Ehsan
 Zara Tareen as Sara
 Shamayal Tareen as Nazia
 Yasir Mazhar as Danish
 Ayesha Khan as Hina's grandmother
 Sami Khan as Zaid (child)
 Ali Mirza as Dani
 Hamza Shah as Rafay

Guest appearance
 Emmad Irfani as Faris (Dead)

Digital release 
Initially, the show was available on Hum TV's YouTube channel but later its episodes were deleted in 2017. In September 2019, the show was again uploaded by Hum TV but this time the music was muted. It was also released on the iflix app as a part of channel's contract with the app but later on, on terminating the contract in 2019, all the episodes were pulled off and thus had no digital availability to stream. The show is also available on MX Player app.

Accolades

References

External links 
 Official Website

Hum TV
Urdu-language television shows
Pakistani drama television series
2017 Pakistani television series debuts
Hum TV original programming